Per Capita is an independent progressive Australian think tank. The think tank was launched on 11 April 2007 by Will Marshall of the U.S. Progressive Policy Institute and Patrick Diamond of the UK’s Policy Network.

Philosophy
As a progressive, centre-left think tank, Per Capita's approach is to view the role of government as a market designer: setting parameters for a liberal economy to produce better social outcomes.

Per Capita's thinking draws on market design theory, full-cost economics, behavioural economics, and political philosophy.

Impact
Per Capita is a think tank of the centre-left in Australia, with a more centrist orientation than counterparts such as the Australia Institute and the Centre for Policy Development. An observer has noted that the think tank has been quoted in speeches on economic reform by the Gillard government.

Research program
Per Capita's research program is focussed on addressing inequality and its impact. Research concerns have included long-term economic reform, the philosophy of tax, climate change, wellbeing and quality of life, population policy, energy and gas, and neuroscience.

Board of directors
 Jacob Varghese (Chair)
 Dee Madigan
 David Hetherington
 Gemma Pinnell
 Rod Glover

Fellows
 Per Capita has nine research fellows.

 Dr John Falzon
 Tanja Kovac
 Dennis Glover
 David Hetherington
 Osmond Chiu
 Warwick Smith
 Shireen Morris
 Julie Connolly
 Tim Lyons
 Dennis Glover

References

External links
 Official website

Think tanks based in Australia
2007 establishments in Australia